John Robertson (born 26 August 2001) is a Scottish professional footballer who plays for Edinburgh City as a forward.

Career
Robertson moved from Tynecastle to St Johnstone in June 2017. He made his senior debut on 21 April 2018, and was praised by manager Tommy Wright. He was loaned to Scottish League Two club Cove Rangers in August 2019 and Forfar Athletic in October 2020.

Robertson was released by St Johnstone after the 2020–21 season and he then signed with Edinburgh City.

Career statistics

References

2001 births
Living people
Scottish footballers
Tynecastle F.C. players
St Johnstone F.C. players
Scottish Professional Football League players
Association football forwards
Cove Rangers F.C. players
Forfar Athletic F.C. players
F.C. Edinburgh players